Eriocitrin (eriodictyol glycoside) is a flavanone-7-O-glycoside between the flavanone eriodictyol and the disaccharide rutinose. It is commonly found in lemons and other citrus fruits.  It is colloquially called lemon flavonoid or a citrus flavonoid, one of the plant pigments that bring color to fruit and flowers.  This antioxidant also predominates (38% in 1 study) in Peppermint infusions. 

The compound has lipid-lowering properties in liver cells.  It is marketed as a dietary supplement, usually in conjunction with B and C vitamins and other substances, but there is no established medical use or FDA approved application of the compound.

See also
Rutin
Quercetin

References

External links

Flavanone glycosides